The 2022 BAL season, also known as BAL Season 2, was the second season of the Basketball Africa League (BAL). The season began on 2 March 2022 and ended with the Finals on 28 May 2022. The group phase was played in the Dakar Arena in Dakar and the Hassan Moustafa Sports Hall in Cairo. The playoffs and finals were played in the BK Arena in Kigali for a second year in a row.

Tunisian club US Monastir won the finals to win its first-ever BAL title, after defeating Angolan club Petro de Luanda in the 2022 BAL Finals. As winners, Monastir qualified for the 2023 FIBA Intercontinental Cup.

Format
On 9 December 2021, the BAL announced a new format for the season, with an expansion of the number of total games to 38. The twelve qualified teams are divided over two conference of six teams, in which all teams play the other teams once. The top eight teams from both conferences advance to the playoffs, which remains a single-elimination tournament.

Team allocation
On 13 October 2021, FIBA announced the 26 teams from 26 countries which participate in the qualification round. Eventually, 8 teams withdrew from the qualifications.
1st, 2nd, etc.: Place in the domestic competition
TH: Title holder
CW: Cup winner
QT: National qualification tournament

Notes

Teams
The twelve teams for the inaugural BAL season had to qualify in their domestic competitions to be able to play in the league, similar to other FIBA-organised competitions. Six teams qualify directly as domestic champions; six winners of the qualifying tournaments qualify as well.

Qualified teams
On 22 May 2020, Petro de Luanda was announced as the first qualified team for the 2021 BAL season. The Angolan FAB had abandoned the season due to the COVID-19 pandemic and awarded the team the place without naming it as champions. Four teams made their debut in the competition. On January 14, 2022, FIBA Africa decided to exclude the Rivers Hoopers as it stated that the Nigeria Basketball Federation failed to organise a national championship. The BAL chose to give AS Salé direct qualification to replace the Nigerian team. REG qualified directly for the regular season as Rwanda hosted the playoffs and finals.

The twelve teams were confirmed by the BAL on 9 December 2021.

Cape Town Tigers (South Africa), Cobra Sport (South Sudan), SLAC (Guinea) and Espoir Fukash (DR Congo) all were the first teams from their countries to play in the BAL.

Bold: the team won the BAL championship in that year.

Personnel and sponsorship

Foreign and Elevate players
Each BAL team was allowed to have four foreign players on its roster, including only two non-African players. Players in italics were signed only for the playoffs. If players have multiple nationalities, the nationality of an African nation is shown.

Each team also featured one player from the NBA Academy Africa, under the new BAL Elevate program.

Schedule

Qualifying tournaments

The qualifying tournaments started on 21 October 2021 and ended on 16 December 2021, with 23 teams from 23 countries participating. Six teams qualified for the group phase.

Group phase
The group phase began on 5 March 2022 in the Dakar Arena in Dakar, where 15 games will be played. From 9 April to 19 April 2022, the group phase continued in Hassan Moustafa Sports Hall in Giza. The four best teams of each conference advanced to the playoffs.

Sahara Conference

Nile Conference

Playoffs

The playoffs began on 21 May and ended on 28 May with the Finals. All games were played in a single-elimination format, and the entire tournament was played at the Kigali Arena in Kigali.

Bracket

Awards
This season, the Coach of the Year award and All-Defensive First Team were introduced and announced on 27 May. The MVP and Defensive Player of the Year were announced on 28 May.
Most Valuable Player: Michael Dixon, US Monastir
Defensive Player of the Year: Ater Majok, US Monastir
Coach of the Year: José Neto, Petro de Luanda
BAL Sportsmanship Award: Anas Mahmoud, Zamalek
All-BAL First Team:
Terrell Stoglin, AS Salé
Édgar Sosa, Zamalek
Carlos Morais, Petro de Luanda
Radhouane Slimane, US Monastir
Ater Majok, US Monastir
All-Defensive Team:
Wilson Nshobozwabyosenumukiza, REG
Childe Dundão, Petro de Luanda
Aboubakar Gakou, Petro de Luanda
Brice Eyaga Bidias, FAP
Ater Majok, US Monastir

Statistics
The following were the statistical leaders in 2022 BAL season, including all playoff games.

Individual statistic leaders

Individual game highs

Team statistic leaders

Notes

References

 
BAL
2021–22 in basketball leagues
Basketball Africa League seasons
BAL
BAL